Three Wives is a 7,450-foot-elevation (2,271 meter) mountain summit located in North Cascades National Park, in Chelan County of Washington state. It is situated in the Methow Mountains, a subset of the North Cascades. Neighbors include Hock Mountain, three miles to the east-northeast, and Bowen Mountain, the nearest higher neighbor, two miles to the south. Precipitation runoff from Three Wives drains into tributaries of Bridge Creek, which in turn is a tributary of the Stehekin River. The first ascent of the summit was made by John Roper on October 10, 1980. This mountain's name was applied by Roper, but has not been officially adopted by the United States Board on Geographic Names, so it does not appear on USGS maps.

Climate
Most weather fronts originate in the Pacific Ocean, and travel east toward the Cascade Mountains. As fronts approach the North Cascades, they are forced upward (Orographic lift) by the peaks of the Cascade Range, causing them to drop their moisture in the form of rain or snowfall onto the Cascades. As a result, the west side of the North Cascades experiences high precipitation, especially during the winter months in the form of snowfall. During winter months, weather is usually cloudy, but, due to high pressure systems over the Pacific Ocean that intensify during summer months, there is often little or no cloud cover during the summer. Because of maritime influence, snow tends to be wet and heavy, resulting in avalanche danger.

Geology
The North Cascades features some of the most rugged topography in the Cascade Range with craggy peaks, ridges, and deep glacial valleys. Geological events occurring many years ago created the diverse topography and drastic elevation changes over the Cascade Range leading to the various climate differences. These climate differences lead to vegetation variety defining the ecoregions in this area.

The history of the formation of the Cascade Mountains dates back millions of years ago to the late Eocene Epoch. With the North American Plate overriding the Pacific Plate, episodes of volcanic igneous activity persisted. In addition, small fragments of the oceanic and continental lithosphere called terranes created the North Cascades about 50 million years ago.

During the Pleistocene period dating back over two million years ago, glaciation advancing and retreating repeatedly scoured the landscape leaving deposits of rock debris. The U-shaped cross section of the river valleys are a result of recent glaciation. Uplift and faulting in combination with glaciation have been the dominant processes which have created the tall peaks and deep valleys of the North Cascades.

See also

Geography of the North Cascades

References

External links
 Localized weather forecast: National Weather Service
North Cascades National Park National Park Service

North Cascades
Mountains of Washington (state)
Mountains of Chelan County, Washington
North Cascades National Park
Cascade Range
North Cascades of Washington (state)
North American 2000 m summits